The following is a list of military equipment of the ROC in World War II (1937–1945) which includes aircraft, artillery, small arms, vehicles and vessels. This list covers the equipment of the National Revolutionary Army, various warlords and including the Collaborationist Chinese Army and Manchukuo Imperial Army, as well as Communist guerillas, encompassing the period of the Second United Front.

Swords and bayonets 
 Dao
 Miaodao
 HY1935 bayonet
 Qiang (spear)
 Shin guntō (used by pro-Japanese officers)
 Type 30 bayonet (used by pro-Japanese forces)

Small arms

Pistols

Submachine guns and automatic pistols

Rifles

Grenades and grenade launchers

Flamethrowers

Machine guns

Infantry held Anti-tank weapons

Vehicle, aircraft and anti-air machine guns 
 Vickers .50 Type-D
 Hotchkiss M1929 machine gun both single- and twin-barrel versions
 Type 92 aircraft gun (captured)
 Type 89 Lewis aircraft gun (captured)?
 Breda-SAFAT light machinegun M1926(used on L3/33 and L3/35)
 Degtyarev M-1928 (DT and DA versions)
 Maxim PV-1 aircraft gun
 Vickers Class "E" aircraft machine gun (70)
 Vickers Class "F" aircraft machine gun (9)
 Colt–Browning MG40 aircraft machine gun (1038 delivered)
 FN Browning Modèle 1932 aircraft machine gun
 Browning M-2 fixed and flexible aircraft machine gun (460 delivered)
 MG-13 light machine gun (for German armored vehicles, 100 delivered)
 Solothurn Model T-6-220 aircraft machine gun (captured Japanese copies)
 Browning M-1919A5 armor machine gun (1640 delivered)

Artillery

Infantry mortars

Field and mountain artillery

Fortress, naval and coastal guns

Anti-tank guns

Anti-aircraft weapons 
The Chinese did not produce AA guns on their own, but used every foreign gun they could put their hands on. Madsen 20 mm cannons were especially widespread.

Vehicles

Tankettes 
  V-C-L Tankette Mk VI (24 were bought and delivered from the United Kingdom between 1929 and 1930)
  Renault UE (10 were bought and delivered from France between 1936 and 1937)
  CV-35 (101 were bought and delivered from Italy between 1937 and 1938)
  Type 94 tankette (18 were supplied to the Collaborationist Chinese Army in 1941)
  Universal Carrier (1,100 in the machine gun version and 400 with 3-inch mortar to the X Force in the Burma Campaign in 1943, but only used for training and never saw combat)

Tanks 

  Renault FT (36 in total are reported, with 14 being bought between 1924 and 1925 and the rest having been captured by Zhang Zuolin after France withdrew from the Russian Civil War in 1920)
  V-C-L Light Amphibious Tank (29 were bought and delivered from the United Kingdom between 1933 and 1935)
  Vickers Mark E Type B (20 were bought and delivered from the United Kingdom between 1934 and 1936)
  Panzer I (15 were bought and delivered from Germany between 1936 and 1937)
  Renault ZB (16 were bought and delivered from France between 1936 and 1940)
  T-26 (82 were supplied in the Soviet Aid Program in 1938)
  BT-5 (4 were supplied in the Soviet Aid Program in 1938)
  M3 Stuart (536 shipped as part of US Lend-Lease, but only 100 used in the Burma Campaign by the X Force between 1943 and 1945)
  M4A4 Sherman (466 provided by the United Kingdom to the X Force in the Burma Campaign in 1944)

Armored cars 
  Leichter Panzerspähwagen (15 in total between 1936 and 1937, mostly Sd.Kfz. 222, two Sd.Kfz. 221 and at least one Sd.Kfz 260)
  M3A1 White Scout (36 were supplied in the American Lend-Lease program in 1941, and 104 more from 1942 onwards)
  BA-10 (the odd captured example given to Manchukuo), BA-3/6 and BA-27 (purchased by the KMT)

Navy ships and war vessels 
 Chinese cruiser Ning Hai
 Chinese cruiser Ping Hai
 Chinese cruiser Chao Ho
 Chinese cruiser Ying Swei
 Chinese cruiser Yat Sen (later in war has become a Japanese training ship "Atada")
 Hai Chou – former British sloop
 Minelayer Huying
 Gunboats
 Yi Sheng
 Hsien Ning
 Chung Ning
 Sui Ning
 Chung Shan (warship) (Capt Sa Shih Chun)**
 Chu Tung
 Yung Sheng
 Chu Chien
 Hu Fu
 Chu Kuan
 Yung Chi
 Chiang Yuan
 Yin Ning (Capt Yen Chuan Ching)
 Hai Ning
 7 more unknown gunboats
 Unknown boat class
 Chung Shan
 Chaing Chen
 Min Sheng
 List of ships of the Second World War

Aircraft 

 1st AFAMF XP-1, indigenous experimental fighter
 Aichi AB-3 – 1 bought from Japan and 1 copy built in China
 Chu XP-0 – prototype only
 Breda Ba.27 – imported from Italy
 Fiat CR.32 – imported from Italy
 Breguet 27 – 6 imported from France
 Gloster Gladiator
 Henschel Hs 123 – 12 bought from Germany
 I-15bis – 29
 I-152 – 252? (may be aka I-15bis)
 Polikarpov I-153 – 75
 I-16 Model 5 – 100+?
 I-16 Model 10 – 132
 I-16 Model 17 – 10
 SB-2M-100A – 179
 SB-2M-103 – 100
 DB-3 – 24
 TB-3 – 6
 Tupolev SB – 13
 Yakovlev UT-1 trainer – 13
 A-12 Shrike
 Northrop A-17
 Vultee A-19
 A-29 Hudson
 Martin B-10
 C-19 Alpha
 Beechcraft Staggerwing C-43
 Beechcraft Model 17 Staggerwing D-17 medevac (10 received)
 Beechcraft Model 18 C-45
 Curtiss C-46 Commando
 Northrop Gamma 2E
 Curtiss BF2C Goshawk (aka Curtiss Hawk III – Models 67 and 68)
 Curtiss F11C Goshawk (aka Hawk II)
 Curtiss-Wright CW-21 – 6 flown, 27 kits not built
 Boeing P-12
 Boeing P-26 Peashooter (aka Model 281) – 11 bought from USA
 Curtiss P-36 Hawk – license production as Hawk 75A-5 and Mohawk IV (8 completed)
 Lockheed P-38 Lightning
 Curtiss P-40 Warhawk
 Republic P-43 Lancer
 North American P-51 Mustang
 Vultee P-66 Vanguard
 North American T-6 Texan trainer (20 received)
 Beechcraft Model 18, trainer modification AT-7 (8 received)
 Cessna AT-17 Bobcat trainer (15 received)
 Boeing-Stearman Model 75, trainer modification PT-17 (150 received)
 Fairchild PT-19 trainer (127 received)
 Ryan PT-22 Recruit trainer (70 received)
 Vultee BT-13 Valiant trainer (30 received)

See also 
 List of equipment used in World War II
 List of common World War II infantry weapons
 List of secondary and special issue World War II infantry weapons
 List of Chinese civil and military/warlord aircraft from before 1937
 Air Warfare of WWII from the Sino-Japanese War perspective

References

Bibliography 
 
 
 
 
 
 
 
 
 
 

 
Chinese Army World War II